Archil Sakhvadze (born 10 March 1978) is a retired Georgian professional football player.

1978 births
Living people
Footballers from Georgia (country)
Expatriate footballers from Georgia (country)
Expatriate footballers in Iran
Georgia (country) international footballers
FC Dinamo Tbilisi players
Saba players
Association football midfielders